Conasauga is an extinct town in Gilmer County, in the U.S. state of Georgia.

History
Conasauga is the site of a former historic Cherokee settlement. "Conasauga" is a name derived from the Cherokee language meaning "grass". Variant names are "Connasauga", "Connesauga", "Connesawga", and "Cunasagee". 

European Americans replaced them in this area after removal. They established a post office called "Connesauga" in 1880, and it operated until 1909. The people abandoned the community, moving to larger towns.

References

Geography of Gilmer County, Georgia
Ghost towns in Georgia (U.S. state)